Wakefield Park is a motor racing circuit located near Goulburn, New South Wales, Australia.

Wakefield Park may also refer to:

New Zealand
Wakefield Park, Wellington, a sports ground and public park in Wellington; see 2017 Women's Knockout Cup

United States
Wakefield Park (Annandale, Virginia), a public park 10 miles on the Capital Beltway outside of Washington D.C.
Wakefield Park (Wakefield, Massachusetts), listed on the NRHP in Massachusetts